Kosta Grozos (born 10 August 2000) is an Australian professional footballer who plays as a central midfielder for Newcastle Jets. He is of Greek descent.

Career

Western Sydney Wanderers
In 2017, Grozos was awarded the Wanderer's NPL Player of the Year having scored 11 goals in 13 games for the Youth team in their NPL NSW 2 campaign.

Grozos was part of the 2017-18 Y-League championship winning Western Sydney Wanderers Youth team. He played the full game as they beat Melbourne City Youth 3–1 in the 2018 Y-League Grand Final on 3 February 2018. 

On 7 August 2018, Grozos made his professional debut in a Round of 32 FFA Cup clash with Hellenic Athletic, starting the game before being withdrawn for Nick Fitzgerald in the 26th minute due to an injury, the Wanderers going on to win the match 4–3. He made his second appearance for Western Sydney in their 3-0 FFA Cup semi-final loss to Sydney FC on 8 October 2018, with Grozos playing the full game. Two days later, he was awarded with a two-year professional contract with the Wanderers.

International career
He is a youth international for the Australia U-20s.

Honours

Club
Western Sydney Wanderers
Y-League: 2017–18

References

External links

2000 births
Living people
Australian soccer players
Australia youth international soccer players
Australian people of Greek descent
National Premier Leagues players
Association football midfielders
Western Sydney Wanderers FC players
Newcastle Jets FC players